Sceloporus albiventris, the white-bellied rough lizard, is a species of lizard in the family Phrynosomatidae. It is endemic to Mexico.

References

Sceloporus
Endemic reptiles of Mexico
Reptiles described in 1939
Taxa named by Hobart Muir Smith